Jeff Williams (born  1963) is Apple's chief operating officer under CEO Tim Cook, a position he has held since December 2015.

Biography
Williams joined Apple in 1998 as head of worldwide procurement and in 2004 he was named vice president of Operations. In 2007, he played a significant role in Apple's entry into the mobile phone market with the launch of the iPhone, and he has led worldwide operations for iPod and iPhone since that time.
Prior to Apple, Williams worked for IBM from 1985 to 1998 in a number of operations and engineering roles. He holds a B.S. in Mechanical Engineering from North Carolina State University and an MBA from Duke University. Williams attended Jesse O. Sanderson High School in Raleigh, NC.

He was promoted to chief operating officer on 17 December 2015.

On June 27, 2019, with the announcement that Jony Ive was leaving Apple to form independent design company with Apple as client, it was noted that design team leaders Evans Hankey, vice president of Industrial Design, and Alan Dye, vice president of Human Interface Design, will report to Jeff Williams.

See also
 Steve Jobs
 Dharam Panesar
 Dan Riccio
 Jony Ive
 Phil Schiller
 Craig Federighi
 Sabih Khan

References

1960s births
Year of birth uncertain
Living people
IBM employees
20th-century American businesspeople
21st-century American businesspeople
Apple Inc. executives
American chief operating officers
Fuqua School of Business alumni